The Angora Fire was a 2007 wind-driven wildfire in El Dorado County, California. It started near North Upper Truckee Road subdivision near Angora Lakes, Fallen Leaf Lake, Echo Lake and South Lake Tahoe, California  around 2:15 PM on Sunday, June 24, 2007, as a result of an illegal campfire. As of July 2, 2007, the fire was 100% contained, and 100% control (all interior fires extinguished) was achieved on July 10. The fire burned 3,100 acres (12.5 km2), destroyed 242 residences and 67 commercial structures, and damaged 35 other homes. At the peak of the fire, there were as many as 2,180 firefighters involved in battling the blaze. As of July 2, 2007, there were still 260 personnel fighting the remaining fires in the interior of the containment line.  The fire cost $11.7 million to fight, and caused at least $141 million in property damage.

Overview
The fire began at approximately 2:15 PM on June 24, 2007, near Seneca Pond, a small lake near Lake Tahoe and the town of Meyers. During that time, the region was experiencing extremely strong winds and low relative humidity, which fanned the fire and created an extremely rapid moving crown fire. Many neighborhoods were evacuated immediately, giving only very short warning to residents, sometimes as short as 5 minutes. In addition to the strong winds, the fire was also fueled by unusually dry conditions in the Sierra Nevada (U.S.). A study concluded that snow pack was 29% of average in 2007.
After an hour of burning, soot began to fall from the sky around the Tahoe Keys area. People flocked to head towards the source, but the firefighters blockaded the road near the high school. A day after the fire started, the state of California declared it a state of emergency, opening up state funds. Full containment of the fire was announced on July 2, 2007, two days before the 4th of July holiday.

Investigation
An investigation into the cause of the fire determined its point of origin. The fire was believed to be human caused, as no thunderstorms were occurring or in the vicinity when the fire began. On June 29, fire department personnel announced that the cause was an illegal campfire (or possibly a discarded cigarette into a campfire pit), and further investigation is pending.

911 dispatcher controversy 
On July 3, the California Highway Patrol announced investigations into whether 911 dispatchers failed to notify authorities about numerous calls that began coming into them about the Angora Fire. A number of calls that were received about the fire were disregarded by dispatchers who claimed that the fire was a controlled burn.

911 calls from cell phones are received by the CHP. Residents in the area as well as golfers on a nearby course made calls that were later found to have not been reported. Investigations were pending as of Friday July 13.

Impacts

As of June 28, over $141 million in damage had occurred. 254 homes were destroyed, 26 damaged, and 3,000 people were forced to evacuate. As of June 28, the cost to fight the fire was estimated at $10 million, with $5.5 million spent so far. FEMA will pay 75%. Losses to the tourist-driven economy are estimated/forecast to be around $1 billion.

Aftermath

Because the fire occurred in the watershed of Lake Tahoe, one of the primary concerns once the fire was out was the potential impact of the ash and debris on the Lake Tahoe hydrological system. Of major concern was the potentially hazardous debris from the 256 structures that were burned in the fire. To address this, the Governor issued Executive Order S-09-07 which initiated a major debris removal project to remove the structural debris as quickly and safely as possible from the 250+ private properties affected by the fire. The debris removal was operationally conducted by the California Integrated Waste Management Board on behalf of El Dorado County. Debris removal activities commenced on July 12, 2007, and was completed by the end of August. Work continues on erosion control measures and removal of potentially hazardous trees. No significant long-term ecological damage is believed to have occurred.

References

External links

Inciweb for Angora Fire
California Department of Forestry & Fire Protection for Angora Fire
Firefighter Blog Coverage
Ongoing coverage and photo gallery Sacramento Bee
Photo gallery of fire KOLOTV.com, Reno, Nevada
Google Earth Tour of fire damage showing destroyed homes
California Integrated Waste Management Board - Angora Fire
Map of Angora Fire and origin at Seneca Pond - SFGate.com, June 28, 2007

Lake Tahoe
2007 California wildfires
Wildfires in El Dorado County, California